Live in America may refer to:

Live in America (Little River Band album), 1980
Live in America (Kitarō album), 1991
Live in América, a 1993 album by Paco de Lucía
Live in America (Neil Diamond album), 1995
Live in America (Transatlantic album), 2001
Live in America (Victor Wooten album), 2001
Live in America (The Babys album), a 2007 album
Live in America (Jorn album), 2007
Live in America (Split Enz album), 2007